Les Cusworth (born 31 July 1954) is a former English rugby union footballer and current Argentine Director of Rugby.

Education
He was educated at Normanton Grammar School and the West Midlands College of Education, a teacher training college (now part of the University of Wolverhampton).

Playing career
He started his club career at Wakefield RFC where he set the British club record of 25 drop goals in just 21 games in the 1974–75 season and helped Wakefield reach the semi finals of the John Player Cup in 1975–76.

He later moved to Moseley and Leicester Tigers from where he won 12 England caps over nine years (1979–1988), although he was never really favoured by the English management as he was an unpredictable running fly half.

He played 365 times for Tigers scoring 947 points, and playing alongside Paul Dodge, Clive Woodward, Nick Youngs in Tigers' three-time John Player Cup winning sides between 1979 and 1981.

He also played for English Colleges, British Colleges, Yorkshire, North East Counties and played in the North Midlands team which won the county championships in 1978.

After retirement
After retiring from playing, he coached an England sevens team, including Lawrence Dallaglio and Matt Dawson to an unexpected World Cup victory at Murrayfield in 1993.

He was director of rugby at Worcester RFC before working freelance and as a rugby public speaker before taking over as Director of Rugby at the Argentina Rugby Union.

References

External links
Rugby Heroes profile

1954 births
Living people
Wakefield RFC players
Moseley Rugby Football Club players
English rugby union players
England international rugby union players
Leicester Tigers players
Rugby union fly-halves
English rugby union coaches
Alumni of the University of Wolverhampton
Sportspeople from Normanton, West Yorkshire
Rugby union players from Wakefield